Exchange Place is a station on the Hudson–Bergen Light Rail (HBLR) located at Hudson Street, between York and Montgomery Streets, in Jersey City, New Jersey.

The station opened on April 15, 2000. There are two tracks, an island platform and a side platform that only serves northbound trains. The station is adjacent to the PATH station of the same name.

The work was done to accommodate new "extended" cars that were introduced to ease overcrowding during peak periods of ridership.

Station layout

Gallery

References

External links

 Exchange Place entrance from Google Maps Street View
 York Street entrance from Google Maps Street View
 Platforms from Google Maps Street View (side platform under scaffolding, 2016)
 Platforms from Google Maps Street View (2018)
 Platforms from Google Maps Street View (evening, 2018)

Hudson-Bergen Light Rail stations
Transportation in Jersey City, New Jersey
Railway stations in the United States opened in 2000
2000 establishments in New Jersey